A scorched-earth policy is a military strategy that aims to destroy anything that might be useful to the enemy. Any assets that could be used by the enemy may be targeted, which usually includes obvious weapons, transport vehicles,  communication sites, and  industrial resources. However, anything useful to the advancing enemy may be targeted, including food stores and agricultural areas, water sources, and even the local people themselves, though the latter group of targets has been banned under the 1977 Geneva Conventions.

The practice can be carried out by the military in enemy territory or in its own home territory while it is being invaded. It may overlap with, but is not the same as, punitive destruction of the enemy's resources, which is usually done as part of political strategy, rather than operational strategy.

Notable historic examples of scorched-earth tactics include William Tecumseh Sherman's March to the Sea in the American Civil War, Kit Carson's subjugation of the American Navajo Indians, Lord Kitchener's advance against the Boers, and the setting on fire of 605 to 732 oil wells by retreating Iraqi military forces during the Gulf War. Also notable were the Russian army's strategies during the failed Swedish invasion of Russia, the failed Napoleonic invasion of Russia, the initial Soviet retreat commanded by Joseph Stalin during the German Army's invasion during the Second World War, and Nazi Germany's retreat on the Eastern Front.

The concept of scorched-earth defense is sometimes applied figuratively to the business world in which a firm facing a takeover attempts to make itself less valuable by selling off its assets.

Ancient warfare

Scythian
The Scythians used scorched-earth methods against the Persian Achaemenid Empire, led by King Darius the Great, during his European Scythian campaign. The Scythians, who were nomadic herders, evaded the Persian invaders and retreated into the depths of the steppes after they had destroyed food supplies and poisoned wells.

Armenian
The Greek general Xenophon recorded in his Anabasis that the Armenians, as they withdrew, burned their crops and food supplies before the Ten Thousand could advance.

Greek
The Greek mercenary general Memnon of Rhodes unsuccessfully suggested to the Persian satraps to use a scorched-earth policy against Alexander the Great, who was moving into Asia Minor.

Roman
The system of punitive destruction of property and subjugation of people when accompanying a military campaign was known as vastatio. Two of the first uses of scorched earth recorded both happened in the Gallic Wars. The first was used when the Celtic Helvetii were forced to evacuate their homes in Southern Germany and Switzerland because of incursions of unfriendly Germanic tribes: to add incentive to the march, the Helvetii destroyed everything they could not bring. After the Helvetii were defeated by combined Roman and Gallic forces, the Helvetii were forced to rebuild themselves on the plains they themselves had destroyed.

The second case shows actual military value: during the Great Gallic War the Gauls under Vercingetorix planned to lure the Roman armies into Gaul and then trap and obliterate them. They thus ravaged the countryside of what are now the Benelux countries and France. This caused immense problems for the Romans, but the Roman military triumphs over the Gallic alliance showed that the ravaging alone was not to be enough to save Gaul from subjugation by Rome.

During the Second Punic War in 218–202 BCE, both Carthaginians and Romans  used the method selectively during Hannibal's invasion of Italy. After the Roman defeat at Lake Trasimene, Quintus Fabius Maximus instructed those living in the path of the invading Carthaginians to burn their houses and grain.

After the end of the Third Punic War in 146 BCE, the Roman Senate also elected to use this method to permanently destroy the Carthaginian capital city, Carthage (near modern-day Tunis). The buildings were torn down, their stones scattered so not even rubble remained, and the fields were burned. However, the story that they salted the earth is apocryphal.

In the year CE 363, the Emperor Julian's invasion of Persia was turned back by a scorched-earth policy:

Post-classical warfare

Late antiquity and early medieval period in Europe
The British monk Gildas wrote in his 6th-century treatise "On the Ruin of Britain" on an earlier invasion: "For the fire of vengeance ... spread from sea to sea ... and did not cease, until, destroying the neighbouring towns and lands, it reached the other side of the island".

During the First Fitna (656–661), Muawiyah I sent Busr ibn Abi Artat to a campaign in the Hejaz and Yemen to ravage territory loyal to Muawiyah's opponent Ali ibn Abi Talib. According to Tabari, 30,000 civilians are estimated to have been killed during that campaign of the civil war. Muawiyah also sent Sufyan ibn Awf to Iraq to burn the crops and homes of Ali's supporters.

During the great Viking invasion of England that was opposed by Alfred the Great and various other Saxon and Welsh rulers, the Viking chieftain Hastein marched his men to Chester in late summer 893 to occupy the ruined Roman fortress there. The refortified fortress would have made an excellent base for raiding northern Mercia, but the Mercians are recorded as having taken the drastic measure of destroying all crops and livestock in the surrounding countryside to starve the Vikings out. They left Chester next year and marched into Wales.

Harrying of the North
In the Harrying of the North, William the Conqueror's solution to stop a rebellion in 1069 was the brutal conquest and subjugation of northern England. William's men burnt whole villages from the Humber to Tees and slaughtered the inhabitants. Food stores and livestock were destroyed so that anyone surviving the initial massacre would soon succumb to starvation over the winter. The destruction is depicted in the Bayeux Tapestry. The survivors were reduced to cannibalism, with one report stating that the skulls of the dead were cracked open so that their brains could be eaten. Between 100,000 and 150,000 perished, and the area took centuries to recover from the damage.

In India
During 1019 and 1022 AD the Chandela Kingdom was attacked by Mahmud of Ghazni. The Chandellas adopted a scorched earth policy. Mahmud, afraid of penetrating too far into the interior, had each time to retreat without much gain and ultimately established a friendly relationship with the Chandellas.

Medieval Europe

During the Hundred Years' War, both the English and the French conducted chevauchée raids over the enemy territory to damage its infrastructure.

Robert the Bruce counselled using those methods to hold off the forces of Edward I of England, who were Scotland, according to an anonymous 14th-century poem:

In 1336, the defenders of Pilėnai, Lithuania, set their castle on fire and committed mass suicide to make the attacking Teutonic Order have only a Pyrrhic victory.

The strategy was widely used in Wallachia and Moldavia, now mostly in Romania and Moldova. Prince Mircea the Elder used it against the Ottoman Empire in 1395, and Stephen the Great did the same as the Ottoman Army advanced in 1475 and 1476.

A slighting is the deliberate destruction, whether partial or complete, of a fortification without opposition. Sometimes, such as during the Wars of Scottish Independence and the English Civil War, it was done to render the structure unusable as a fortress. In England, adulterine (unauthorised) castles would usually be slighted if captured by a king. During the Wars of Scottish Independence, Robert the Bruce adopted a strategy of slighting Scottish castles to prevent them being occupied by the invading English. A strategy of slighting castles in Palestine was also adopted by the Mamlukes during their wars with the Crusaders.

Early modern era
Further use of scorched-earth policies in a war was seen during the 16th century in Ireland, where it was used by English commanders such as Walter Devereux and Richard Bingham.

The Desmond Rebellions were a famous case in Ireland. Much of the province of Munster was laid waste. The poet Edmund Spenser left an account of it:

In 1630, Field-Marshal General Torquato Conti was in command of the Holy Roman Empire's forces during the Thirty Years' War. Forced to retreat from the advancing Swedish army of King Gustavus Adolphus, Conti ordered his troops to burn houses, destroy villages and cause as much harm generally to property and people as possible. His actions were remembered thus:

During the Great Northern War, Russian Emperor Peter the Great's forces used scorched-earth tactics to hold back Swedish King Charles XII's campaign towards Moscow.

Wallachian-Ottoman Wars

In 1462, a massive Ottoman army, led by Sultan Mehmed II, marched into Wallachia. Vlad the Impaler retreated to Transylvania. During his departure, he conducted scorched-earth tactics to ward off Mehmed's approach. When the Ottoman forces approached Tirgoviste, they encountered over 20,000 people impaled by the forces of Vlad the Impaler, creating a "forest" of dead or dying bodies on stakes. The atrocious, gut-wrenching sight caused Mehmed to withdraw from battle and to send instead Radu, Vlad's brother, to fight Vlad the Impaler.

Great Siege of Malta

In early 1565, Grandmaster Jean Parisot de Valette ordered the harvesting of all the crops in Malta, including unripened grain, to deprive the Ottomans of any local food supplies since spies had warned of an imminent Ottoman attack. Furthermore, the Knights poisoned all of the wells with bitter herbs and dead animals. The Ottomans arrived on 18 May, and the Great Siege of Malta began. The Ottomans managed to capture one fort but were eventually defeated by the Knights, the Maltese militia and a Spanish relief force.

Nine Years' War

In 1688, France attacked the German Electoral Palatinate. The German states responded by forming an alliance and assembling a sizeable armed force to push the French out of Germany. The French had not prepared for such an eventuality. Realising that the war in Germany was not going to end quickly and that the war would not be a brief and decisive parade of French glory, Louis XIV and War Minister Marquis de Louvois resolved upon a scorched-earth policy in the Palatinate, Baden and Württemberg. The French were intent on denying enemy troops local resources and on preventing the Germans from invading France. By 20 December 1688, Louvois had selected all the cities, towns, villages and châteaux intended for destruction. On 2 March 1689, the Count of Tessé torched Heidelberg, and on 8 March, Montclar levelled Mannheim. Oppenheim and Worms were finally destroyed on 31 May, followed by Speyer on 1 June, and Bingen on 4 June. In all, French troops burnt over 20 substantial towns as well as numerous villages.

Mughal-Maratha Wars
In the Maratha Empire, Shivaji Maharaj had introduced scorched-earth tactics, known as Ganimi Kava. His forces looted traders and businessmen from Aurangzeb's Mughal Empire and burnt down his cities, but they were strictly ordered not to rape or hurt the innocent civilians and not to cause any sort of disrespect to any of the religious institutes.

Shivaji's son, Sambhaji Maharaj, was detested throughout the Mughal Empire for his scorched-earth tactics until he and his men were captured by Muqarrab Khan and his Mughal Army contingent of 25,000. On 11 March 1689, a panel of Mughal qadis indicted and sentenced Sambhaji to death on accusations of casual torture, arson, looting and massacres but most prominently for giving shelter to Sultan Muhammad Akbar, the fourth son of Aurangzeb, who had sought Sambhaji's aid in winning the Mughal throne from the emperor, his father. Sambhaji was particularly condemned for the three days of ravaging committed after the Battle of Burhanpur.

19th century

Napoleonic Wars
During the third Napoleonic invasion of Portugal in 1810, the Portuguese population retreated towards Lisbon and was ordered to destroy all the food supplies the French might capture as well as forage and shelter in a wide belt across the country. (Although effective food-preserving techniques had recently been invented, they were still not fit for military use because a suitably-rugged container had not yet been invented.) The command was obeyed as a result of French plundering and general ill-treatment of civilians in the previous invasions. The civilians would rather destroy anything that had to be left behind, rather than leave it to the French.

After the Battle of Bussaco, André Masséna's army marched on to Coimbra, where much of the city's old university and library were vandalised. Houses and furniture were destroyed, and the few civilians who did not seek refuge farther south were murdered. While there were instances of similar behavior by British soldiers, since Portugal was their ally, such crimes were generally investigated and those found punished. Coimbra's sack made the populace even more determined to leave nothing, and when the French armies reached the Lines of Torres Vedras on the way to Lisbon, French soldiers reported that the country "seemed to empty ahead of them". When Massená reached the city of Viseu, he wanted to replenish his armies' dwindling food supplies, but none of the inhabitants remained, and all there was to eat were grapes and lemons that if eaten in large quantities would be better laxatives than sources of calories. Low morale, hunger, disease and indiscipline greatly weakened the French army and compelled the forces to retreat the next spring. That method was later recommended to Russia when Napoleon made his move.

In 1812, Emperor Alexander I was able to render Napoleon's invasion of Russia useless by using a scorched-earth retreat policy, similar to that of Portugal. As Russians withdrew from the advancing French army, they burned the countryside (and allegedly Moscow) over which they passed, leaving nothing of value for the pursuing French army. Encountering only desolate and useless land Napoleon's Grande Armée was prevented from using its usual doctrine of living off the lands that it conquered. Pushing relentlessly on despite dwindling numbers, the Grand Army met with disaster as the invasion progressed. Napoleon's army arrived in a virtually-abandoned Moscow, which was a tattered starving shell of its former self, largely because of scorched-earth tactics by the retreating Russians. Having conquered essentially nothing, Napoleon's troops retreated, but the scorched-earth policy came into effect again because even though some large supply dumps had been established on the advance, the route between them had both been scorched and marched over once already. Thus, the French army starved as it marched along the resource-depleted invasion route.

South American War of Independence
In August 1812, Argentine General Manuel Belgrano led the Jujuy Exodus, a massive forced displacement of people from what is now Jujuy and Salta Provinces to the south. The Jujuy Exodus was conducted by the patriot forces of the Army of the North, which was battling a Royalist army.

Belgrano, faced with the prospect of total defeat and territorial loss, ordered all people to pack their necessities, including food and furniture, and to follow him in carriages or on foot together with whatever cattle and beasts of burden that could endure the journey. The rest (houses, crops, food stocks and any objects made of iron) was to be burned to deprive the Royalists of resources. The strict scorched-earth policy made him ask on 29 July 1812 the people of Jujuy to "show their heroism" and to join the march of the army under his command "if, as you assure, you want to be free". The punishment for ignoring the order was execution, with destruction of the defector's properties. Belgrano labored to win the support of the populace and later reported that most of the people had willingly followed him without the need of force.

The exodus started on 23 August and gathered people from Jujuy and Salta. People travelled south about 250 km and finally arrived at the banks of the Pasaje River, in Tucumán Province in the early hours of 29 August. They applied a scorched-earth policy and so the Spaniards advanced into a wasteland. Belgrano's army destroyed everything that could provide shelter or be useful to the Royalists.

Greek War of Independence
In 1827, Ibrahim Pasha of Egypt led an Ottoman-Egyptian combined force in a campaign to crush Greek revolutionaries in the Peloponnese. In response to Greek guerrilla attacks on his forces in the Peloponnese, Ibrahim launched a scorched earth campaign which threatened the population with starvation and deported many civilians into slavery in Egypt. He also allegedly planned to bring in Arab settlers to replace the Greek population. The fires of burning villages and fields were clearly visible from Allied ships standing offshore. A British landing party reported that the population of Messinia was close to mass starvation. Ibrahim's scorched-earth policy caused much outrage in Europe, which was one factor for the Great Powers (United Kingdom, the Kingdom of France and the Russian Empire) decisively intervening against him in the Battle of Navarino.

Philippine–American War
The Philippine–American War often included scorched-earth campaigns in the countryside. Entire villages were burned and destroyed, with torture (water cure) and the concentration of civilians into "protected zones." Many civilian casualties were caused by disease and famine.

In the hunt for guerrilla leader Emilio Aguinaldo, American troops also poisoned water wells to try to force out the Filipino rebels.

American Civil War

In the American Civil War, Union forces under Philip Sheridan and William Tecumseh Sherman used the policy widely. General Sherman used that policy during his March to the Sea.

Sherman's tactics were an attempt to destroy the enemy's will and logistics through burning or destroying crops or other resources that might be used for the Confederate force. Later generations of American war leaders would use similar total war tactics in World War II, the Korean War, the Vietnam War, the Iraq war, and the Afghanistan War, largely through the use of air power.

Another event, in response to William Quantrill's raid on Lawrence, Kansas and the many civilian casualties, including the killing of 180 men, Brigadier General Thomas Ewing Jr., Sherman's brother-in-law, issued US Army General Order No. 11 (1863) to order the near-total evacuation of three-and-a-half counties in western Missouri, south of Kansas City, which were subsequently looted and burned by US Army troops. Under Sherman's overall direction, General Philip Sheridan followed that policy in the Shenandoah Valley of Virginia and then in the Indian Wars of the Great Plains.

When General Ulysses Grant's forces broke through the defenses of Richmond, Virginia, Confederate President Jefferson Davis ordered the destruction of Richmond's militarily-significant supplies. The resulting conflagration destroyed many buildings, most of which were commercial, as well as Confederate warships docked on the James River. Civilians in panic were forced to escape the fires that had been started.

Native American Wars

During the wars with Native American tribes of the American West, Kit Carson, under James Henry Carleton's direction, instituted a scorched-earth policy, burning Navajo fields and homes and stealing or killing their livestock. He was aided by other Indian tribes with long-standing enmity toward the Navajos, chiefly the Ute tribe. The Navajo were forced to surrender because of the destruction of their livestock and food supplies. In the spring of 1864, 8000 Navajo men, women, and children were forced to march 300 miles to Fort Sumner, New Mexico. Navajos call it "The Long Walk." Many died along the way or during their four years of internment.

A military expedition, led by Colonel Ranald S. Mackenzie, was sent to the Texas Panhandle and the Oklahoma Territory Panhandle in 1874 to remove the Indians to reservations in Oklahoma. The Mackenzie expedition captured about 1,200 of the Indians' horses, drove them into Tule Canyon, and shot all of them. Denied their main source of livelihood and demoralized, the Comanche and the Kiowa abandoned the area (see Palo Duro Canyon).

Second Boer War

During the Second Boer War (1899–1902), British forces applied a scorched-earth policy in the occupied Boer republics under the direction of General Lord Kitchener. Numerous Boers, refusing to accept military defeat, adopted guerrilla warfare despite the capture of both of their capital cities. As a result, under Lord Kitchener's command British forces initiated a policy of the destruction of the farms and the homes of civilians in the republics to prevent the Boers who were still fighting from obtaining food and supplies. Boer noncombatants inhabiting the republics (mostly women and children) were interned in concentration camps to prevent them from supplying guerillas still in the field.

The existence of the concentration camps was exposed by English activist Emily Hobhouse, who toured the camps and began petitioning the British government to change its policy. In an attempt to counter Hobhouse's activism, the British government commissioned the Fawcett Commission, but it confirmed Hobhouse's findings. The British government then claimed that it perceived the concentration camps to be humanitarian measure and were established to care for displaced noncombatants until the war's end, in response to mounting criticism of the camps in Britain. A number of factors, including outbreaks of infectious diseases, a lack of planning and supplies for the camps, and overcrowding led to numerous internees dying in the camps. A decade after the war, historian P. L. A. Goldman estimated that 27,927 Boers died in the concentration camps, 26,251 women and children (of whom more than 22,000 were under the age of 16) and 1,676 men over the age of 16, with 1,421 being above the age of 16.

Māori Wars
In 1868, the Tūhoe, who had sheltered the Māori leader Te Kooti, were thus subjected to a scorched-earth policy in which their crops and buildings were destroyed and the people of fighting age were captured.

20th century

World War I

On the Eastern Front of World War I, the Imperial Russian Army created a zone of destruction by using a massive scorched-earth strategy during their retreat from the Imperial German Army in the summer and the autumn of 1915. The Russian troops, retreating along a front of more than 600 miles, destroyed anything that might be of use to their enemy, including crops, houses, railways and entire cities. They also forcibly removed huge numbers of people. In pushing the Russian troops back into Russia's interior, the German army gained a large area of territory from the Russian Empire that is now Poland, Ukraine, Belarus, Latvia and Lithuania.

On the Western Front on 24 February 1917, the German army made a strategic scorched-earth withdrawal from the Somme battlefield to the prepared fortifications of the Hindenburg Line to shorten the line that had to be occupied. Since a scorched-earth campaign requires a war of movement, the Western Front provided little opportunity for the policy as the war was mostly a stalemate and was fought mostly in the same concentrated area for its entire duration.

Greco-Turkish War (1919–22)

During the Greco-Turkish War (1919–22), the retreating Greek Army carried out a scorched-earth policy while it was fleeing from Anatolia in the final phase of the war.  The historian Sydney Nettleton Fisher wrote, "The Greek army in retreat pursued a burned-earth policy and committed every known outrage against defenceless Turkish villagers in its path".

Norman Naimark noted that "the Greek retreat was even more devastating for the local population than the occupation".

Second Sino-Japanese War

During the Second Sino-Japanese War, the Imperial Japanese Army had a scorched-earth policy, known as "Three Alls Policy", which caused immense environmental and infrastructure damage to be recorded. It contributed to the complete destruction of entire villages and partial destruction of entire cities.

The Chinese National Revolutionary Army destroyed dams and levees in an attempt to flood the land to slow down the advancement of Japanese soldiers, which further added to the environmental impact and resulting in the 1938 Yellow River flood. In the 1938 Changsha fire, the city of Changsha was put on fire by the Kuomintang  to prevent any wealth from falling into enemy hands.

World War II

At the start of the Winter War in 1939, the Finns used the tactic in the vicinity of the border in order to deprive the invading Soviet Red Army's provisions and shelter for the forthcoming cold winter. In some cases, fighting took place in areas that were familiar to the Finnish soldiers who were fighting it. There were accounts of soldiers burning down their very own homes and parishes. One of the burned parishes was Suomussalmi.

When Germany attacked the Soviet Union in June 1941, many district governments took the initiative to begin a partial scorched-earth policy to deny the invaders access to electrical, telecommunications, rail, and industrial resources. Parts of the telegraph network were destroyed, some rail and road bridges were blown up, most electrical generators were sabotaged through the removal of key components, and many mineshafts were collapsed.  The process was repeated later in the war by the German forces of Army Group North and Erich von Manstein's Army Group Don, which stole crops, destroyed farms, and razed cities and smaller settlements during several military operations. The rationale for the policy was that it would slow pursuing Soviet forces by forcing them to save their own civilians, but in Manstein's postwar memoirs, the policy was justified as to have prevented the Soviets from stealing food and shelter from their own civilians. The best-known victims of the German scorched-earth policy were the people of the historic city of Novgorod, which was razed during the winter of 1944 to cover Army Group North's retreat from Leningrad.

Near the end of the summer of 1944, Finland, which had made a separate peace with the Allies, was required to evict the German forces, which had been fighting against the Soviets alongside Finnish troops in northern Finland. The Finnish forces, under the leadership of General Hjalmar Siilasvuo, struck aggressively in late September 1944 by making a landfall at Tornio. That accelerated the German retreat, and by November 1944, the Germans had left most of northern Finland. The German forces, forced to retreat because of an overall strategic situation, covered their retreat towards Norway by devastating large areas of northern Finland by using a scorched-earth strategy. More than a third of the area's dwellings were destroyed, and the provincial capital Rovaniemi was burned to the ground. All but two bridges in Lapland Province were blown up, and all roads were mined.

In northern Norway, which was also being invaded by Soviet forces in pursuit of the retreating Wehrmacht in 1944, the Germans also undertook a scorched-earth policy of destroying every building that could offer shelter and thus interposing a belt of "scorched earth" between themselves and the allies.

In 1945, Adolf Hitler ordered his minister of armaments, Albert Speer, to carry out a nationwide scorched-earth policy, in what became known as the Nero Decree. Speer, who was looking to the future, actively resisted the order, just as he had earlier refused Hitler's command to destroy French industry when the Wehrmacht was being driven out of France. Speer managed to continue doing so even after Hitler became aware of his actions.

During the Second World War, the railroad plough was used during retreats in Germany, Czechoslovakia and other countries to deny enemy use of railways by partially destroying them.

Malayan Emergency
Britain was the first nation to employ herbicides and defoliants (chiefly Agent Orange) to destroy the crops and the bushes of Malayan National Liberation Army (MNLA) insurgents in Malaya during the Malayan Emergency. The intent was to prevent MNLA insurgents from utilizing rice fields to resupply their rations and using them as a cover to ambush passing convoys of Commonwealth troops.

Goa War
In response to India's invasion of Portuguese Goa in December 1961 during the annexation of Portuguese India, orders delivered from Portuguese President Américo Tomás called for a scorched-earth policy for Goa to be destroyed before its surrender to India.

However, despite his orders from Lisbon, Governor General Manuel António Vassalo e Silva took stock of the superiority of the Indian troops and of his forces' supplies of food and ammunition and took the decision to surrender. He later described his orders to destroy Goa as "a useless sacrifice" (um sacrifício inútil)".

Vietnam War
The United States used Agent Orange as a part of its herbicidal warfare program Operation Ranch Hand to destroy crops and foliage to expose possible enemy hideouts during the Vietnam War. Agent Blue was used on rice fields to deny food to the Viet Cong.

Persian Gulf War

During the 1990 Persian Gulf War, when Iraqi forces were driven out of Kuwait, they set more than 600 Kuwaiti oil wells on fire. That was done as part of a scorched-earth policy during the retreat from Kuwait in 1991 after Iraqi forces had been driven out by Coalition military forces. The fires were started in January and February 1991, and the last one was extinguished by November 1991.

Central America
Efraín Ríos Montt used the policy in Guatemala's highlands in 1981 and 1982, but it had been used under the previous president, Fernando Romeo Lucas García. Upon entering office, Ríos Montt implemented a new counterinsurgency strategy that called for the use of scorched earth to combat the Guatemalan National Revolutionary Unity rebels. Plan Victoria 82 was more commonly known by the nickname of the rural pacification elements of the strategy, Fusiles y Frijoles (Bullets and Beans).  Ríos Montt's policies resulted in the death of thousands, most of them indigenous Mayans.

Bandung Sea of Fire

The Indonesian military used the method during Indonesian National Revolution when the British forces in Bandung gave an ultimatum for Indonesian fighters to leave the city. In response, the southern part of Bandung was deliberately burned down in an act of defiance as they left the city on 24 March 1946. This event is known as the Bandung Sea of Fire (Bandung Lautan Api).

The Indonesian military and pro-Indonesia militias also used the method in the 1999 East Timorese crisis. The Timor-Leste scorched-earth campaign was around the time of East Timor's referendum for independence in 1999.

Yugoslav Wars
 
The method was used during the Yugoslav Wars, such as against the Serbs in Krajina by the Croatian Army, and by Serbian paramilitary groups.

21st century

Darfur War
The government of Sudan used scorched earth as a military strategy in Darfur War.

Sri Lankan Civil War
During the 2009 Sri Lankan Civil War, the United Nations Regional Information Centre accused the government of Sri Lanka of using scorched-earth tactics.

Libyan Civil War
During the 2011 Libyan Civil War, forces loyal to Moammar Gadhafi planted a large number of landmines within the petroleum port of Brega to prevent advancing rebel forces from utilizing the port facilities. Libyan rebel forces practiced scorched-earth policies when they completely demolished and refused to rebuild critical infrastructure in towns and cities that had been loyal to Gadhafi such as Sirte and Tawargha.

Russian invasion of Ukraine

Russia invaded Ukraine on 24 February 2022. Russia is using a scorched earth policy to destroy the Ukrainian economy to cause panic within the civilian population and to destroy the civil infrastructure of cities and villages.

Myanmar civil war

In March 2023, the Office of the United Nations High Commissioner for Human Rights condemned the Burmese military's use of a scorched earth strategy, which has killed thousands of civilians, displaced 1.3 million people and destroyed 39,000 houses throughout the country since the 2021 Myanmar coup d'état, as the military has denied  humanitarian access to survivors, razed entire villages, and used indiscriminate airstrikes and artillery shelling.

See also

 Area bombing
 Aerial bombing of cities
 Area denial
 Bellum se ipsum alet, the strategy of relying on occupied territories for resources
 Burmah Oil Co. v Lord Advocate
 Carthaginian peace
 Chevauchée
 Early thermal weapons
 Ecocide
 Environmental impact of war
 Fabian strategy
 Harrying of the North
 Lam chau (doctrine)
 Railroad plough
 Salted bomb
 Salting the earth
 Sherman's neckties
 Total war
 Well poisoning

Notes

References

Aftermath of war
Environmental impact of war
Military tactics
Military terminology
Economic warfare